is a Japanese marathon runner from Isesaki, Gunma Prefecture, Japan.

He finished sixth at the 2004 Summer Olympics and seventh at the 2007 World Championships.

His personal best time is 2:07:55 hours, achieved in December 2003 at the Fukuoka Marathon. In the half marathon his personal best time is 1:03:00 hours, achieved in July 2003 in Sapporo. He also has 28:15.45 minutes in the 10,000 metres.

Achievements

References

1977 births
Living people
Japanese male long-distance runners
Athletes (track and field) at the 2004 Summer Olympics
Olympic athletes of Japan
Japanese male marathon runners